The 2015–16 James Madison Dukes men's basketball team represented James Madison University during the 2015–16 NCAA Division I men's basketball season. The Dukes, led by eighth year head coach Matt Brady, played their home games at the James Madison University Convocation Center and were members of the Colonial Athletic Association. James Madison finished the regular season with an 11–7 record in conference, finishing in a tie for third place. The Dukes lost in the quarterfinals of CAA tournament to William & Mary. They finished the season with a 21–11 overall record.

On March 14, 2016, James Madison fired head coach Matt Brady.

Previous season 
The Dukes finished the season 19–14, 12–6 in CAA play to finish in a four way tie for the CAA regular season championship. They lost in the quarterfinals of the CAA tournament to Hofstra. They were invited to the CollegeInsider.com Tournament where they lost in the first round to USC Upstate.

Departures

Incoming transfers

Under NCAA transfer rules, Ramone Snowden will have to sit out for the 2015–16 season. Snowden will have two years of remaining eligibility following the 2015–16 season.

Recruiting

Roster

Schedule

|-
!colspan=9 style="background:#450084; color:#C2A14D;"| Non-conference regular season

|-
!colspan=9 style="background:#450084; color:#C2A14D;"| CAA regular season

|-
!colspan=9 style="background:#450084; color:#C2A14D;"| CAA tournament

See also
2015–16 James Madison Dukes women's basketball team

References

James Madison Dukes men's basketball seasons
James Madison
James Madison